The Korisliiga is the premier basketball league in Finland. The 2008-09 season was the 69th Finnish club basketball season. It began on October 3, 2008 and ended on May 16, 2009. Namika Lahti won the Final series by 3-0 against Joensuun Kataja. Antti Nikkilä won the MVP Award and Vesa Mäkäläinen won the Finals MVP Award.

Regular season

Individual leaders 
Statistics are for the regular season.

Scoring

Assists

Rebounds

Playoffs

References
Korisliiga Schedule & Results

Korisliiga seasons
Finnish
Koris